Geordie Lyall (born September 15, 1976) is a Canadian former professional soccer player.

He spent virtually his entire career playing for Canadian club Vancouver Whitecaps, with the exception of a brief period in England with lower-league club Walsall.

Career

College
Lyall played college soccer at the University of Victoria from 1994 to 1998.

Professional
Lyall began his professional career with the Vancouver Whitecaps in 1999, and spent the next seven years there, playing 135 games and helping the team to their first USL First Division championship in 2006. He spent a brief spell in England with Walsall, although he never actually made a first team appearance for the Saddlers.

He re-signed with the Whitecaps in June 2007. On 12 October 2008 he helped the Whitecaps capture their second USL First Division Championship beating the Puerto Rico Islanders 2-1 in Vancouver On January 20, 2009 the Whitecaps announced the contract extensions of Lyall for the 2009 season; he subsequently played 7 games (253 minutes) in his final season with the Whitecaps.

Lyall retired from playing professional soccer on October 30, 2009, stating that he will be continuing his career as an educator.

International
Lyall has represented Canada at international futsal.

Personal
Lyall is the older brother of Matthew Lyall, lead singer of Canadian indie rock band The Racoons.

References

External links
Player profile at the Vancouver Whitecaps

1976 births
Living people
Canadian expatriate soccer players
Canadian soccer players
Expatriate footballers in England
Association football defenders
Soccer players from Toronto
A-League (1995–2004) players
USL First Division players
Vancouver Whitecaps (1986–2010) players
Walsall F.C. players
Canadian expatriate sportspeople in England